Michael Andrew Gough (born 18 December 1979) is an English cricket umpire and former cricketer. He was a right-handed batsman and a right-arm off-break bowler. Gough is an international umpire and is a member of the Elite Panel of ICC Umpires, representing the England and Wales Cricket Board.

Playing career
Having played in two Youth Test matches in 1997, he impressed enough to become a fully fledged member of the Durham side of 1998, having previously been an occasional member of their Second XI side, and carrying on in this role for five more years. In his debut in Second XI cricket, he finished his first innings admirably, but went out in the second innings for a duck. Gough played in eleven Youth Test Matches, debuting in South Africa in December 1997, in a match which ended up as a draw having seen England Under-19s follow on from 130 runs behind. He subsequently played against Pakistan, New Zealand and Australia Under-19s.

He fell out of love with the sport at the highest level and retired at the age of 23. During a spell working in his father's sports shop in Hartlepool, he played football for Horden, Spennymoor Town, Barrow and in the Hartlepool Sunday Morning League, he decided he wanted to get back involved in cricket as a coach or umpire. He took umpiring exams at Stockton Cricket Club during the winter of 2005 and umpired his first match in the summer of 2005 (Bishop Auckland 3rds v Sedgefield 3rds). Michael has also refereed in the Hartlepool Sunday Morning Football League.

Umpiring career
Gough umpired in the Second XI Championship and in the Second XI trophy, officiating his first game in April 2006. He has umpired in several  ODI games and Twenty20 Internationals since he made his debut as an international umpire in 2013. He was selected as one of the twenty umpires to stand in matches during the 2015 Cricket World Cup, where he was the on-field umpire in three group stage matches. On 28 July 2016 he stood in his first Test match, between Zimbabwe and New Zealand at the Queens Sports Club in Bulawayo.

In April 2019, he was named as one of the sixteen umpires to stand in matches during the 2019 Cricket World Cup. In July 2019, Gough along with Joel Wilson, were promoted to the Elite Panel of ICC Umpires, following the retirement of Ian Gould and exclusion of Sundaram Ravi.

In April 2020, he was cited as the umpire with the highest percentage of his on-field decisions upheld after a player review, with 95.1% of his on-field decisions upheld after a player review, from all of the 14 umpires who have officiated in at least 10 Test matches since September 28, 2017.

Gough was named the ECB Umpire Of The Year for an unprecedented 8 years in a row from 2010. In June 2021, Gough was named as one of the on-field umpires for the 2021 ICC World Test Championship Final.

Personal life
He is a supporter of Hartlepool United FC and in January 2021 was appointed honorary president of the Hartlepool United Supporters Trust

See also
 List of Test cricket umpires
 List of One Day International cricket umpires
 List of Twenty20 International cricket umpires

References

External links
 

1979 births
Living people
Sportspeople from Hartlepool
English cricketers
Durham cricketers
English cricket umpires
English Test cricket umpires
English One Day International cricket umpires
English Twenty20 International cricket umpires
People educated at English Martyrs School and Sixth Form College
Cricketers from County Durham